George William Hart (born 1955) is an American sculptor and geometer.  Before retiring, he was an associate professor of Electrical Engineering at Columbia University in New York City and then an interdepartmental research professor at Stony Brook University.  His work includes both academic and artistic approaches to mathematics.

He is the father of mathematics popularizer and YouTuber Vi Hart.

Education and career
Hart received a B.S. in Mathematics from MIT (1977), an M.A. in Linguistics from Indiana University (1979), and a Ph.D. in Electrical Engineering and Computer Science from MIT (1987).

His academic work includes the online publication Encyclopedia of Polyhedra, the textbook Multidimensional Analysis, and the instruction book Zome Geometry.  He has also published over sixty academic articles.  His artistic work includes sculpture, computer images, toys (e.g. Zome) and puzzles.

He worked with John H. Conway to promote and standardize the Conway polyhedron notation.

Sculptures
Hart's public sculptures can be seen at locations around the world, including MIT, U.C. Berkeley, Stony Brook University, Princeton University, Duke University, The University of Arizona, Queen's University at Kingston, Macalester College,  Pratt Institute, Albion College, Middlesex University, Aalto University, and The Polytechnic University of Valencia.

Inventions
Hart is a coinventor on two US patents,  Digital ac monitor and  Non-intrusive appliance monitor apparatus. These patents cover, in part, an improved electrical meter for homes called nonintrusive load monitors.  These meters track changes in voltage and current usage by a given household and then deduce which appliances are using how much electricity and when.

Museum of Mathematics
Hart is a co-founder of North America's only Museum of Mathematics, MoMath, in New York City. As chief of content, he set the "Math is Cool!" tone of the museum and spent five years designing original exhibits and workshop activities for it.

Bibliography
 Multidimensional Analysis: Algebras and Systems for Science and Engineering, 1995, 
 Zome Geometry - Hands-on Learning with Zome Models, 2001,

Gallery

References

External links

 
 Geometric sculpture
 The Incompatible Food Triad
 

1955 births
Living people
20th-century American mathematicians
21st-century American mathematicians
Geometers
Stony Brook University faculty
Indiana University alumni
Massachusetts Institute of Technology School of Science alumni
Mathematical artists
Recreational cryptographers
Mathematics popularizers
Puzzle designers